Winter Magic is a Christmas album by Christchurch, New Zealand soprano Hayley Westenra. The album was called Christmas Magic in some territories, and was released in Japan as Winter Magic: Fuyu No Kagayaki – Koibito Tachi No Pure Voice. The album features traditional Christmas songs (like Coventry Carol) and more contemporary Christmas songs (as Joni Mitchell's classic, River).

Winter Magic includes "The Little Road to Bethlehem", "Silent Night", "Veni Veni Emmanuel", "The Little Drummer Boy", and "The Coventry Carol", among other seasonal songs.  These Christmas tunes combine Westenra's voice with the accompaniment of a choral group. Westenra herself wrote three new songs for the CD: "Peace Shall Come", "All With You", and "Christmas Morning".  The variety of melodies, as well as the different genres, of the songs included were designed to showcase the versatility of Hayley's voice to perform classically, as in "Corpus Christi Carol", as well as in a considerably more "pop" style for songs like "Peace Shall Come". Westenra’s ability to achieve such variety in a single album has garnered her critical praise.

Track listing
Little Road to Bethlehem
Carol of the Bells
Christmas Song (Chestnuts Roasting on an Open Fire)
Veni Veni Emmanuel
Silent Night
Christmas Morning
Sleigh Ride
River
Little Drummer Boy
Corpus Christi Carol
All with You
Coventry Carol
Winter's Dream
Peace Shall Come
On the Wings of Time (Japanese Bonus Track)
It's Only Christmas (with Ronan Keating (from Boyzone) - UK and NZ Bonus Track)

Release history

Charts

Album

Tours

Asia
3 October 2009– National Theater and Concert Hall, Republic of China, Taipei
11 October 2009– Music in the Air Festival, Tokyo International Forum
12 October 2009– Kobe International House, Kobe
15 October 2009– Shirakawa Hall, Sakae, Nagoya
17 October 2009– Tokorozawa Civic Cultural Centre Muse, Tokorozawa, Saitama
18 October 2009– Yokohama Minato Mirai Hall, Yokohama

United Kingdom
23 November 2009– Peterborough Cathedral
24 November 2009– Ripon Cathedral
26 November 2009– Manchester Cathedral
28 November 2009– Banbury St. Mary's
2 December 2009– Tewkesbury Abbey
3 December 2009– Exeter Cathedral
14 December 2009– Norwich Cathedral
19 December 2009– Bristol Cathedral
21 December 2009– Barbican Centre

References

External links
 Official Site
 Japanese Edition Info
 Japan Tour on Hayley Westenra International

Hayley Westenra albums
2009 Christmas albums
Christmas albums by New Zealand artists
Classical Christmas albums